Thanasis Vagias (1765–1834) was a Greek counselor and confidant of Ali Pasha, the Muslim Albanian ruler of Ottoman Epirus.

Biography
Thanasis Vagias was born in Lekël, Tepelenë. He was the older brother of Loukas Vagias. His name had become notorious because, under Ali's service, he led an attack against the village of Kardhiq, near Gjirokaster, modern southern Albania. As a result of this operation, hundreds of men, women and children were killed. When the Greek War of Independence ended, Vagias moved to the newly founded Greek state and was given a government post and later acquired a pension, by the head of state of Greece, Ioannis Kapodistrias.

As a native of Epirus, Vagias proposed to Kapodistrias that Epirus should become part of Greece, but his plan was not accepted due to the difficult conditions the Greek revolution faced that time.

Legacy
According to various authors, Vagias was wrongly regarded as a traitor of the Greek cause by various historians and authors of that period, like Ioannis Makrygiannis, Aristotelis Valaoritis, and Alexandre Dumas, père. Valaoritis's masterpiece was titled Thanasis Vagias after him. In this work, Vagias is presented as a traitor, who after his death returns to his home place as a vampire. Additionally, one of the main characters of the Greek traditional shadow theatre, Karagiozis, is named Thanasis Vagias, who is a servant of Ali Pasha and is portrayed as a cowardly warrior.

See also 

 Loukas Vagias
 Greek War of Independence
 Pashalik of Yanina

References

Citations

Sources

 (Project Gutenberg EBook of Ali Pacha: Celebrated Crimes)

 (Myriobiblos - The Ballad-Poetry of Modern Greece)

External links
Θανάσης Βάγιας (Greek) Thanasis Vagias, by A. Valaoritis.
Χρήστου Δάλλα, Ιστορικαί σελίδες at Εθνικόν Ημερολόγιον Σκόκου 1912, Vol. 27, 1912, p. 340 - 351. (Greek) A survey about Vagias ( includes a Vagias' letter to the notables of Delvinaki ), by C. Dallas.

1765 births
1834 deaths
People from Tepelenë
Ali Pasha of Ioannina
18th-century Greek people
19th-century Greek people